Damian Ardestani, more known by the pseudonym and his artist name XOV is a Swedish Platinum-certified artist, songwriter and producer scoring chart successes in Europe. He has collaborated with Lorde on The Hunger Games: Mockingjay, Part 1 – Original Motion Picture Soundtrack where his song "Animal" (curated by Lorde) is featured. He is also one of the two founders of I AM YOU, a renowned help organization with over 100 volunteers based in Lesvos, Greece. The organization is saving lives by providing rescue and relief teams to Europe's borders in the wake of the global refugee crisis.

On New Year's Eve 2015/16, XOV was on stage in Berlin, Germany playing to an audience of more than a million at The Brandenburg Gate. During the same year, he performed in multiple cities in Europe including Stockholm, Gothenburg, Berlin, London and Oslo. In December, 2015 he had his first show in the United States playing in Brooklyn, NY.

His 2015 EP "Lucifer" and debut album Wild (2015) has been streamed over 45.000.000 times on Spotify.

Discography

Albums

EPs

Singles 

Others
 2014: "City of Lights" (with Lush & Simon)
 2014: "Boys Don't Cry"
 2014: "Animal"

References

1985 births
Living people
Swedish hip hop musicians
Swedish pop singers
English-language singers from Sweden
21st-century Swedish singers